All's Well That Ends Well is the debut album by American post-hardcore band Chiodos, released through Equal Vision Records in July 2005. Four music videos for the songs "One Day All Women Will Become Monsters", "The Words 'Best Friend' Become Redefined", "Baby, You Wouldn't Last a Minute on the Creek", and "All Nereids Beware" have been produced for the promotion of the album. The album has sold more than 200,000 copies as of 2008.

Track listing

Re-release DVD
Live At The Metro – Chicago
"There's No Penguins In Alaska"
"Baby, You Wouldn't Last a Minute on the Creek"

Live At Bamboozle – New Jersey
"The Words 'Best Friend' Become Redefined"
"All Nereids Beware"

Live At The Chain Reaction – California
"To Trixie And Reptile, Thanks For Everything" (Acoustic)

Home Movies
On Tour With Chiodos
Recording 'Lindsay Quit Lollygagging'

Personnel
Chiodos
 Craig Owens – lead vocals
 Jason Hale – lead guitar
 Pat McManaman – rhythm guitar
 Matt Goddard – bass guitar
 Derrick Frost – drums
 Bradley Bell – keyboards, piano, vocals

Production
Produced, engineered and mixed by Marc Hudson
Mastered by Alan Douches, at West West Side Music, West New York / Tenafly, New Jersey
Art direction and design by Paul A. Romano (workhardened.com)

Trivia
The song "One Day Women Will All Become Monsters" is a reference to Shakespeare's play King Lear. Many of the lyrics from the song as well as the title of the song are taken almost word for word from the play.
The song "To Trixie And Reptile, Thanks For Everything" is a reference to old girlfriends of band members Craig Owens and Bradley Bell
The song "There's No Penguins In Alaska" is made up from a number of Shakespeare's sonnets. The chorus comes from line 5 of Shakespeare's Fifth, the term "murderous shame" is borrowed from line 14 of his Ninth, and the lyrics "The worst was this; my love was my decay" are taken from line 14 of his Eightieth.
The line "star-crossed lovers" from the song "Expired In Goreville" is derived from William Shakespeare's Romeo and Juliet.
Sandie Jenkins is a woman from Bradley Bell's church who would call his mother, and he could not recall where he had met her, thus the track title.
In a Podcast interview with AP Magazine, Craig Owens revealed that the song "Baby, You Wouldn't Last a Minute on the Creek" is lyrically about Craig wanting to quit the band, not about the end of a relationship like majority assumed.
The song title "There's No Penguins in Alaska" was originally a Snapple fact from inside of the cap.
The end of the song "Baby, You Wouldn't Last A Minute On The Creek" is actually the first track, "Prelude", in reverse.
In the song, "All Nereids Beware", the opening line "This spring of love resembles the uncertain glory of an April day" is a modern adaptation of a line said by Proteus in the Shakespearean play The Two Gentlemen of Verona.
The Phrase "I'll Stop Stabbing When You Stop Screaming" is printed on the side of the liner behind the CD tray.

Charts
Album

References

Chiodos albums
2005 debut albums
Equal Vision Records albums